Edmund Moeller (8 August 1885 in Neustadt, Bavaria – 19 January 1958 in Dresden, Saxony), German sculptor of the first half of the twentieth century, he studied in Dresden and Düsseldorf, was award-winning art from its beginnings, it is one of those rare artists whose original work was able to win the praise of success. In few works, as in the vast work of Moeller, so diaphanous is the process of artistic evolution, the inquisitions, the hesitations, the affectations, the profound influences.

Life and career
Moeller was born in Neustadt in the district of Coburg, a city of the Free State of Bavaria in the Federal Republic of Germany. He studied in the cities of Dresden and Düsseldorf and also in Italy. On 22 March 1907 Prince Johann Georg of Coburg, representing the academic council of Dresden, whose Academy of Arts Moeller was a disciple of Roberto Diez, the young sculptor gave the top prize of 200,000 marks, to pursue studies in Italy. For his work in the Freedom Monument in the city of Trujillo, received from Peruvian government the highest title that grants the state: The Medal The Sun of Peru and also the title of professor, died in Dresden, a city that had longer residence time.

Work

As the most famous of his works of sculpture is considered the Liberty Memorial opened in 1927 in the city of Trujillo, Peru's freedom monument in honor of the 100 of early proclaimed the independence of Trujillo. This sculpture is located in the Plaza Mayor of the City of Trujillo. Edmund Moeller won the international competition held by the Municipality of Trujillo for the construction of the sculpture whose work until the inauguration lasted 4 years one month and 25 days for the Memorial Freedom remains totally and permanently installed in place.

Moeller's career is a series of triumphs. Both statues such as marble and bronze portraits you deserve praise in newspapers such as the Dresdner Nachrichten Neuete and the Dresdner Anzeiger The graceful elegance of the Ball Young earned him the Prix de Rome, and in the art exhibition in Berlin in 1914, received the gold medal. The Lamentation marble statue was acquired the following year by the state of Saxony for the Museum of Leipszig, and in 1918 the Museum purchased Albartinum Dresden bust of Max Liebermann and the Prussian Ministry of the group worship Samson with the lion, for German evangelical Church in Rome.

References

1885 births
1958 deaths
German sculptors
German male sculptors
People from Coburg (district)
20th-century sculptors